Grimoldby is a village and civil parish in the East Lindsey district of Lincolnshire, England.

Grimoldby Grade I listed Anglican church is dedicated to St Edith. It is of early Perpendicular style with embattled and crocketed aisles and clerestory, set with gargoyles.

In 1885 Kelly's Directory reported that the chief crops grown were wheat, barley, beans and oats, and that Grimoldby had three chapels, Wesleyan, Primitive Methodist and Free Methodist, and a National School.

Village amenities include a Co-op supermarket, Grimoldby Primary School, a nursery, an Italian restaurant and a cricket club. There is a public house, called The Manby Arms.

Grimoldby used to have a railway station.

Governance
An electoral ward in the same name exists. Grimoldby is in the centre of this ward which had a population taken at the 2011 census of 2181.

References

External links

 The Lancaster Inn website

Villages in Lincolnshire
Civil parishes in Lincolnshire
East Lindsey District